Silicon Valley Polytechnic Institute (SVPTI), also referred to as California Valley Polytechnic Institute (CalPT) and Silicon Valley Technical Institute (SVTI) was established in 1998. SVPTI is a provider of certificate training programs and is located in the heart of Silicon Valley, in San Jose, California, United States. SVPTI provides training programs covering topics in Software, Electronic Design, Semiconductor Technology, IC Packaging and Test, Communication and Computer Engineering, as well as Electronic, Mechanical and Architectural drafting. SVPTI has been honored with several awards from the industry as shown below.

Awards
Synopsys Inc., a leading developer of semiconductor design software, selected SVPTI to receive a Charles Babbage grant owing to its focus and dedication to the high-tech electronic industry as well as the quality of its training programs.

Mentor Graphics Corporation announced that it is enabling SVPTI to develop and offer some continuing education courses based on Mentor's tools in the areas of design for manufacturability (DFM), nanometer IC design, physical verification and integrated systems design.

References

External links
Official site
Official site

For-profit universities and colleges in the United States
Private universities and colleges in California